Holly Springs is a city in, and the county seat of, Marshall County, Mississippi, United States, near the border with Tennessee to the north.  Along with the Mississippi Delta, in the 19th century, the area was developed by European Americans for cotton plantations. After the Civil War, many freedmen continued to work in agriculture as sharecroppers and tenant farmers.

As the county seat, the city is a center of trade and court sessions. The population was 7,699 at the 2010 census, which, compared to the 2000 census, was a decrease. Holly Springs has several National Register of Historic Places-listed properties and historic districts, including Southwest Holly Springs Historic District, Holly Springs Courthouse Square Historic District, Depot-Compress Historic District, and East Holly Springs Historic District. Hillcrest Cemetery contains the graves of five Confederate generals, and has been called "Little Arlington of the South".

History
European Americans founded Holly Springs in 1836 on territory occupied by Chickasaw Indians for centuries before Indian Removal. Most of their land was ceded under the Treaty of Pontotoc Creek of 1832. Many early U.S. migrants were from Virginia, supplemented by migrants from Georgia and the Carolinas.

In 1836, the city had 4,000 European-American residents. A year later, records show that 40 residents were lawyers, and there were six physicians by 1838. By 1837, the town already had "twenty dry goods stores, two drugstores, three banks, several hotels, and over ten saloons." It is also home to Hillcrest Cemetery, built on land settler William S. Randolph gave the city in 1837.

Newcomers established the Chalmers Institute, later known as the University of Holly Springs, Mississippi's oldest university.

The area was developed with extensive cotton plantations dependent on the labor of enslaved African Americans. Many had been transported from the Upper South in the domestic slave trade, breaking up families. The settlement served as a trading center for the neighboring cotton plantations. In 1837, it was made seat of the newly created Marshall County, named for John Marshall, the United States Supreme Court justice. The town developed a variety of merchants and businesses to support the plantations. Its population into the early twentieth century included a community of Jewish merchants, whose ancestors were immigrants from eastern Europe in the 19th century. The cotton industry suffered in the crisis of 1840, but soon recovered.

By 1855 Holly Springs was connected to Grand Junction, Tennessee, by the Mississippi Central Railway. In ensuing years, the line was completed to the south of Hill Springs. Toward the end of the 19th century, the Kansas City, Memphis and Birmingham Railroad was constructed to intersect this line in Holly Springs.

During the American Civil War, Union General Ulysses S. Grant temporarily used Holly Springs as a supply depot and headquarters. He was mounting an effort to take the city of Vicksburg. Confederate Earl Van Dorn led the successful Holly Springs Raid on the town in December 1862, destroying most of the Union supplies at the Confederate Armory Site. The campus of the Holly Springs Female Institute, which had been open since 1836, was also burned, forcing it to permanently close. Grant eventually succeeded in ending the siege of Vicksburg with a Union victory.

In 1878, Holly Springs suffered a yellow fever epidemic, part of a regional epidemic that spread through the river towns. 1,400 residents became ill and 300 died. The Marshall County Courthouse, at the center of Holly Springs's square, was used as a hospital during the epidemic.

After the war and emancipation, many freedmen stayed in the area, working as sharecroppers on former plantations. There were tensions after the war.
As agriculture was mechanized in the early 20th century, there were fewer farm labor jobs. From 1900 to 1910, a quarter of the population left the city. Many blacks moved to the North in the Great Migration to escape southern oppression and seek employment in northern factories. The invasion of boll weevils in the 1920s and 1930s, which occurred across the South, destroyed the cotton crops and caused economic problems on top of the Great Depression. Some light industry developed in the area. After World War II, most industries moved to the major cities of Memphis, Tennessee and Birmingham, Alabama.

Geography

Climate
Holly Spring's climate is characterized by hot, humid summers and generally mild to cool winters. According to the Köppen Climate Classification system, Holly Springs has a humid subtropical climate. On December 23, 2015, a massive EF4 tornado struck the town around 6:00 pm, causing significant damage. James Richard Anderson, the Marshall County coroner, confirmed the boy's death. Nearly 200 Marshall County structures were damaged during the tornado, some totally.

Demographics

2020 census

As of the 2020 United States Census, there were 6,968 people, 2,369 households, and 1,259 families residing in the city.

2010 census
As of the 2010 United States Census, there were 7,699 people living in the city, making it a minority-majority city: 79.2% of the residents were African American, 19.3% White, 0.2% Native American, 0.2% Asian, 0.6% from some other race, and 0.5% from two or more races. 1.2% were Hispanic or Latino of any race.

2000 census
As of the census of 2000, there were 7,957 people, 2,407 households, and 1,699 families living in the city. The racial makeup of the city was 22.81% White, 76.18% African American, 0.06% Native American, 0.16% Asian, 0.03% Pacific Islander, 0.06% from other races, and 0.69% from two or more races. Hispanic or Latino of any race were 0.59% of the population.

There were 2,407 households, out of which 36.4% had children under the age of 18 living with them, 34.3% were married couples living together, 31.9% had a female householder with no husband present, and 29.4% were non-families. 27.2% of all households were made up of individuals, and 10.0% had someone living alone who was 65 years of age or older. The average household size was 2.66 and the average family size was 3.22.

In the city, the population was spread out, with 25.1% under the age of 18, 19.1% from 18 to 24, 27.6% from 25 to 44, 17.2% from 45 to 64, and 11.1% who were 65 years of age or older. The median age was 29 years. For every 100 females, there were 101.7 males. For every 100 females age 18 and over, there were 101.6 males.

The median income for a household in the city was $23,408, and the median income for a family was $25,808. Males had a median income of $29,159 versus $20,777 for females. The per capita income for the city was $12,924. About 27.5% of families and 32.0% of the population were below the poverty line, including 44.6% of those under age 18 and 21.2% of those age 65 or over.

Education
The City of Holly Springs is served by the Holly Springs School District.

Marshall Academy is a private institution for the MPSA, offering k-4 through 12th grade. Rust College was established in 1866 by the Freedman's Aid Society of the Methodist Episcopal Church to serve freedmen and is a historically black college.

The now defunct Mississippi Industrial College, intended as a vocational training school, was in Holly Springs, as was the Holly Springs Female Institute.

Notable people
 James F. Trotter (1802–1866), judge and U.S. Senator who resided in Holly Springs until his death.
 Spires Boling (1812–1880), architect and builder
 Winfield S. Featherston (1820–1891), two-term member of United States House of Representatives, Confederate brigadier general during the Civil War, later a state politician and circuit court judge.
 Hiram Rhodes Revels (1822–1901), first African American to serve in the United States Senate;first president of Alcorn State University; taught theology at Shaw University (present-day Rust College).
 Edward Cary Walthall (1831–1898), Confederate general, lawyer, and U.S. Senator from Mississippi
 Ida B. Wells (1862–1931), African-American journalist, anti-lynching activist, and advocate for civil rights and women's rights; born in Holly Springs.
Absolom M. West (1818–1894), planter, politician, Civil War general and labor organizer, resided in Holly Springs after the American Civil War until his death.
Verina Morton Jones (1865–1943), African-American physician and the first woman to practice medicine in the state; served as resident physician at Rust College
 Edward Hull "Boss" Crump (1874–1954), head of the dominant Democratic Party political machine in Memphis during the first half of the 20th century, was born in Holly Springs
 Kate Freeman Clark (1875–1957), painter
 Wall Doxey (1892–1962), Mississippi politician, served as Congressman and United States Senator; Wall Doxey State Park was named after him
 Lation Scott (1893-1917), African American lynching victim
 Irving Vendig (1902–1995), television writer
 William Baskerville Hamilton (1908-1972), historian who taught public school in Holly Springs in the 1930s
 Clifton DeBerry (1924–2006), born in Holly Springs, was the first African American nominated for President of the United States by a political party (Socialist Workers Party, 1964, 1980)
 R. L. Burnside (1926–2005), blues musician
 Junior Kimbrough (1930–1998), blues musician
 Gary Montez Martin (1973–2019), perpetrator of the 2019 Aurora, Illinois shooting
 Syl Johnson (1936-2022), blues and soul singer
 Robert Belfour (1940-2015), blues musician
 Cassi Davis (born 1964), actress.
 Shepard Smith (born 1964), American broadcast journalist for NBC News and CNBC, born in Holly Springs. Attended high school at Marshall Academy, one of the private schools in town.
 Clinton LeSueur (born 1969), Republican politician; he lost races in 2002 and 2004 for Mississippi's 2nd congressional district to incumbent Democrat Bennie Thompson
 Seth Adams (born 1985), University of Mississippi American football quarterback
 Jeremy LeSueur (born 1980), University of Michigan American football defensive back.
 Paul Maholm (born 1982), pitcher for the Los Angeles Dodgers.
 Mel and Tim (Mel Hardin and Tim McPherson), soul musicians from Holly Springs who recorded at Stax Records in Memphis
 Charlie Feathers, (1932-1998), rockabilly musician

In popular culture
 The 1999 movie Cookie's Fortune was set and filmed in Holly Springs.

The Jackson, Mississippi, band The Weeks sing about Holly Springs in their 2014 song "Brother in the Night."
 Graceland Too, a museum dedicated to Elvis Presley has been referenced in songs by Parquet Courts and Phoebe Bridgers

See also 

Hillcrest Cemetery
Strawberry Plains Audubon Center

References

External links

 Holly Springs Ledger, 1837-1904 (MUM00232) at the University of Mississippi.

 
Cities in Marshall County, Mississippi
County seats in Mississippi
Cities in the Memphis metropolitan area
Populated places established in 1836
1836 establishments in Mississippi
Cities in Mississippi
Yellow fever monuments and memorials